Octave Dayen (6 June 1906 – 14 September 1987) was a French cyclist. He competed in four events at the 1928 Summer Olympics.

References

External links
 

1906 births
1987 deaths
French male cyclists
Olympic cyclists of France
Cyclists at the 1928 Summer Olympics
Sportspeople from Creuse
Cyclists from Nouvelle-Aquitaine